Mark Edwards (born 1942) is an Australian actor best known for his appearances in British horror films of the early 1970s.

He was cast as Cassio in a production of Othello at the Old Tote. He studied at Bristol in the mid 1960s then moved to England and was in steady work.

He moved back to Australia in the mid 1970s.

Select Film and TV Credits
Consider Your Verdict
Rusty Bugles (1965)
The Recruiting Officer (1965)
Adventures of the Seaspray - A Strange Charter (1967)
ITV Playhouse - Bon Voyage (1968) 
The Mind of Mr. J.G. Reeder - The Troupe (1969)
Counterstrike -  Backlash (1969) 
The Wednesday Play - All Out for Kangaroo Valley (1969)
ITV Sunday Night Theatre - Hester Lilly (1969)
W. Somerset Maugham - Virtue (1970) 
A Family at War (1970)
Cromwell (1970)
The Troubleshooters - The Bent Bonanza (1971) 
Blood from the Mummy's Tomb (1971)
The Last Valley (1971)
Tower of Evil (1972)
Love Story - Sweet Sorrow (1972)
The Boldest Job in the West (1972)
Diamonds on Wheels (1973) (TV Movie)
Terror in the Wax Museum (1973)
A Point in Time (1973)
Arthur of the Britons - People of the Plough (1973) 
The Carnforth Practice (1974) (TV Series)
La joven casada (1975)
Murcheson Creek (1976) (TV Movie)
Hospitals Don't Burn Down! (1978)
Shimmering Light (1978)
Roadhouse (1979) (TV Movie)

Theatre Credits
Coventry medieval mystery plays with the New England Theatre Centre
Wuthcring Heights for the Education Department,
Christ in the Concrete City
How the West Was Lost (1964) by Barry Creyton
Othello (1965) with Ron Haddrick
A Severed Head (1965)
Wrong Side of the Moon
Faithful in My Fashion
Porgy and Bess

References

External links
Mark Edwards at IMDb

Australian actors
1942 births
Living people